Urosalpinx cinerea, common name the eastern oyster drill or Atlantic oyster drill, is a species of small predatory sea snail, a marine gastropod mollusk in the family Muricidae, the murexes or rock snails.

They use chemoreception in their environment and are found to be sessile and encrusting organisms. Microscopic particles released by prey are carried through the sea water and captured by the Atlantic oyster drill. This animal is not physically able to close itself from its surrounding environment because of its siphonal canal.

This species is a serious problem in commercial oyster beds, and it has been accidentally introduced well outside its natural range.

Distribution
This snail is endemic to the Atlantic coast of North America, from Nova Scotia to Nassau Sound in in Florida.  It has been accidentally introduced with oyster spat to Northern Europe and to the West Coast of North America from California to Washington. They range in areas with salinity and temperature changing seasonally and with the tidal currents.

Description
The shell is usually light brown or yellowish, rarely with several revolving, indistinct, rufous bands. Within the aperture varying from light flesh-color to dark salmon, chocolate or ourple.

The fusiform shell is solid and thick and has a sharply pointed apex. 

Sculpture: prominent broad ribs and numerous longitudinal folds, which are strong but rounded and wavelike, the intervals like the folds reversed. The aperture measures one-half the total length of shell. The aperture is long-oval, passing below into a vshort, open siphonal canal. The outer lip is thin. 

The animal is small, the foot scarcely covering the aperture, very little dilated at the front angles, cream-colored, margined with lemon color beneath, punctured with light drab above. The siphon merely surpasses the tip of the siphonal canal. The head is scarcely protruded ; tentaeula nearly united at origin ; eyes black, at the outer upper third of tentacula, which third is a mere filament, are contractile. The motions of the shell are sluggish. 

The eggs of Urosalpinx cinerea are contained in small transparent membranous parchment-like vases, each of which is attached by an expanded foot to some solid substance, usually the under surface of an overhanging rock, a little above low-tide mark. Each female deposits from ten or twelve to more than a hundred of these vases, the process of laying occupying several weeks. The vases are generally attached in more or less regular rows, covering sometimes an area of three or four square inches. In shape and size they are like the egg-cases of Purpura, but without the slight reddish tinge of the latter. They are flattened verticall}y, and their edges are marked by keel-like ridges. Owing to the lengthened period of oviposition, eggs and embryos in all stages of development are to be found in the various vases of a group, and the young escape from the firstlaid vases before the female has finished laying. Unlike the vases of Purpura each of which contains several hundred eggs, those of Urosalpinx contain only from six to twenty, ten or twelve being the usual number. All of these normally undergo development, and give rise to embryos. Occasionally a partially segmented egg or more advanced embryo becomes abortive and breaks up into separate cells, each of which remains alive for some time, and often swims actively by the motion of its cilia. These cosmelae and the yolk of the aborted eggs are drawn into the digestive cavities of other embryos, but this method of furnishing the young with food is exceptional and accidental.

Habitat
This species lives from low tide down to a depth of 25 feet. Its surroundings are rocky and shell beds. It inhabits the lower third of the littoral zone, therefore it is sheltered from any waves the ocean produces.

Life habits
As indicated by its common name, this predatory snail drills through the shells of living oysters and consumes them. Its surroundings are rocky and shell beds. It inhabits the lower third of the littoral zone, therefore it is sheltered from any waves the ocean produces. It selects its food of choice by the odor of the prey. Once it embraces the barnacle or mussel with its foot, it drills through the shell. It feeds on many different species of invertebrates. A few favorites are the barnacle Balanus balanoides and the mussel Mytilus edulis. Food supply is mainly found in intertidal areas in the Atlantic region. The Atlantic oyster drill finds its food by smell. They are found to be more responsive to living prey than to prey that has been killed recently in a lab. However there is still no preference when it comes to the prey species or age.

Just like any other animal, ecological factors affect the growth of an individual. The type of food, amount of food, and the amount of time given for a species to grow are all important factors. Chloride and sodium, inorganic ions, are some of the major effectors of blood in marine and estuarine invertebrates, including the Atlantic oyster drill.

They range in size, but male and female oyster drills average 24 millimeters and 28 millimeters, respectively. Not only are females longer, but they are also taller than their males. Almost all Atlantic oyster drills reach their largest size after two full growing seasons. About 70% of their size is reached within this time span. In the next four or so years to come, there is little or no increase in size anymore. Unfortunately, there is no protected way to check the sex of these gastropods. Their shell must be crushed in order to see the genitalia using a microscope. Although some females possess a small vestigial formation that may look like a penis, other parts are used to confirm the sex. Finding the egg capsule gland, ovary, and any sperm ingesting glands make it easier to identify the oyster drill as a female.

Human relevance
Due to their ability of "drilling" into shells, the destruction of their nature can cost millions of dollars every single year.

This snail is a serious problem in commercial oyster farming:
"Next to the sea star, this snail is the worst enemy the ... [oyster fisher men] ... have to contend with. ...Settling upon a young bivalve, the oyster drill quickly bores a neat round hole through a valve, making expert use of its sandpaperlike radula. Through this perforation the oyster drill is able to insert its long proboscis and consume the soft parts of the oyster."
Advocates of making use of bycatch, rather than discarding it, have promoted the oyster drill as a food, similar to escargot.

References

 A. J. W. Hendy, D. P. Buick, K. V. Bulinski, C. A. Ferguson, and A. I. Miller. 2008. Unpublished census data from Atlantic coastal plain and circum-Caribbean Neogene assemblages and taxonomic opinions.
 Pratt, D.M., 1974. Attraction to prey and stimulus to attack in the predatory gastropod Urosalpinx cinerea. Mar. Biol. 27, 37–45.

External links
 U. cinerea at Gastropods.com
 MBL Marine Organisms Database page

cinerea
Molluscs of the Atlantic Ocean
Gastropods described in 1822
Taxa named by Thomas Say